German submarine U-1010 was a Type VIIC/41 U-boat of Nazi Germany's Kriegsmarine during World War II.

She was ordered on 23 March 1942, and was laid down on 23 February 1943, at Blohm & Voss, Hamburg, as yard number 210. She was launched on 5 January 1944, and commissioned under the command of Oberleutnant zur See Otto Bitter on 22 February 1944.

Design
German Type VIIC/41 submarines were preceded by the heavier Type VIIC submarines. U-1010 had a displacement of  when at the surface and  while submerged. She had two shafts and two  propellers.

U-1010 was fitted with five  torpedo tubes (four fitted at the bow and one at the stern), fourteen torpedoes or 26 TMA or TMB Naval mines, one  SK C/35 naval gun, (220 rounds), one  Flak M42 and two  C/30 anti-aircraft guns. The boat had a complement of between forty-four and fifty-two.

Service history
U-1010 participated in one war patrol which resulted in no ships damaged or sunk.

U-1010 had a Schnorchel underwater-breathing apparatus fitted out sometime before April 1945.

On 14 May 1945, U-1010 surrendered at Loch Eriboll, Scotland and was later transferred to Lisahally. Of the 156 U-boats that eventually surrendered to the Allied forces at the end of the war, U-1010 was one of 116 selected to take part in Operation Deadlight. U-1010 was towed out and sank on 7 January 1946, by naval gunfire from the Polish destroyer .

See also
 Battle of the Atlantic

References

Bibliography

External links

German Type VIIC/41 submarines
U-boats commissioned in 1944
World War II submarines of Germany
1944 ships
Ships built in Hamburg
Maritime incidents in 1946
World War II shipwrecks in the Atlantic Ocean
Operation Deadlight
U-boats sunk by Polish warships